Admiral Sir Rudolf Miles Burmester,  (11 November 1875 – 27 December 1956) was a Royal Navy officer who went on to be Commander-in-Chief, Africa Station.

Naval career
Burmester joined the Royal Navy in 1890. He was promoted to lieutenant in 1897, and in July 1902 posted as a gunnery officer to the protected cruiser HMS Highflyer, flagship of the Commander-in-Chief, East Indies Station. He served in World War I and, having been promoted to captain in June 1914, commanded HMS Euryalus at Galipolli in 1915 for which he was mentioned in despatches. He served as Chief of Staff to the Commander-in-Chief of the Mediterranean Fleet in the closing stages of the War. In 1922 he was appointed Commanding Officer of HMS Victory and, having been promoted to rear admiral in 1924. Between 1926 and 1928 he was Director of the Naval Mobilisation Department. He was appointed Commander-in-Chief, Africa Station in 1929.

He also served in World War II as Commander of Naval Forces based in the Swansea area.

He lived at The Elms in Thames Ditton.

Family
In 1907 he married Marjorie Gladys Lloyd.

References

External links
Royal Navy Officers 1939−1945

1875 births
1956 deaths
Military personnel from Surrey
Royal Navy admirals
Knights Commander of the Order of the British Empire
Companions of the Order of the Bath
Companions of the Order of St Michael and St George
Royal Navy personnel of World War I